Daniel Vocatius sometimes Vocensis, Vocacensis or Vocacio (died 1577) was a Croat prelate of the Catholic Church who served as the bishop of Duvno from 1551 to 1557, the coadjutor bishop of Sigüenza from 1557 to 1575 and the bishop of Muro Lucano from 1575 to 1577.

Biography 

Daniel Vocatius was a native of Split in present-day Croatia. He was a Franciscan friar. On request of certain believers from the Diocese of Duvno, Pope Julius III appointed Daniel Vocatius as bishop of Duvno on 2 December 1551. He was consecrated a bishop in Rome. At the end of 1551 or in early 1552, Vocatius brought with him four diocesan priests to appoint them as vicars in the Diocese of Duvno in order to have clergy under his direct jurisdiction. However, the Bosnian Franciscans who considered that they had an exclusive right to chaplaincy opposed to this, and the diocesan priests were sent back. Vocatius remained bishop of Duvno until 1557, when he was appointed coadjutor bishop of Sigüenza. On 9 May 1575 Vocatius was appointed bishop of Muro Lucano by Pope Gregory XIII.

Footnotes

References

Books

External links and additional sources 

  (for Chronology of Bishops) 
  (for Chronology of Bishops) 

1577 deaths
Clergy from Split, Croatia
Bishops of Duvno
Bishops of Sigüenza
Bishops of Muro Lucano
Franciscan bishops
Bishops appointed by Pope Julius III
Bishops appointed by Pope Paul IV
16th-century Italian Roman Catholic bishops